Petapa Zapotec (Zapoteco de Santa María Petapa) is a Zapotecan language of the isthmus of Mexico.

References

Zapotec languages